The Zee Cine Award Best Editing is a technical award.

The winners are listed below:-

See also 
 Zee Cine Awards
 Bollywood

Zee Cine Awards
Film editing awards